Testosterone cypionate, sold under the brand name Depo-Testosterone among others, is an androgen and anabolic steroid (AAS) medication which is used mainly in the treatment of low testosterone levels in men. It is also used in hormone therapy for transgender men. It is given by injection into muscle or subcutaneously, once every one to four weeks, depending on clinical indication.

Side effects of testosterone cypionate include symptoms of masculinization like acne, increased hair growth, voice changes, and increased sexual desire. The drug is a synthetic androgen and anabolic steroid and hence is an agonist of the androgen receptor (AR), the biological target of androgens like testosterone and dihydrotestosterone (DHT). It has strong androgenic effects and moderate anabolic effects, which make it useful for producing masculinization and suitable for androgen replacement therapy. Testosterone cypionate is a testosterone ester and a long-lasting prodrug of testosterone in the body. Because of this, it is considered to be a natural and bioidentical form of testosterone.

Testosterone cypionate was introduced for medical use in 1951. Along with testosterone enanthate, testosterone undecanoate, and testosterone propionate, it is one of the most commonly used testosterone esters. It is used mainly in the United States. In addition to its medical use, testosterone cypionate is used to improve physique and performance. The drug is a controlled substance in many countries and so non-medical use is generally illicit.

Medical uses

Testosterone cypionate is used primarily in androgen replacement therapy. It is currently FDA approved for the treatment of primary or hypogonadotropic hypogonadism (either congenital or acquired). Its safety in andropause (late-onset hypogonadism in men) has not yet been established. It is currently used off-label for breast cancer, breast disorders, delayed puberty in boys, oligospermia (low sperm count), hormone replacement therapy in transgender men, and osteoporosis.

Side effects

Side effects of testosterone cypionate include virilization among others. It can also create conditions for heart attack, enlargement of prostate gland, liver malfunction, issues related to coagulation, pulmonary embolism, and polycythemia.

Pharmacology

Pharmacodynamics

Testosterone cypionate is a prodrug of testosterone and is an androgen and anabolic–androgenic steroid (AAS). That is, it is an agonist of the androgen receptor (AR).

Pharmacokinetics
The pharmacokinetics of testosterone cypionate via depot intramuscular injection, including its elimination half-life and duration of action, are said to be extremely comparable to and hence essentially the same as those of testosterone enanthate. As such, testosterone cypionate and testosterone enanthate are considered to be "functionally interchangeable" as medications. For reference, testosterone enanthate has an elimination half-life of 4.5 days and a mean residence time of 8.5 days and requires frequent administration of approximately once per week. Large fluctuations in testosterone levels result with it, with levels initially being elevated and supraphysiological. The pharmacokinetics of testosterone cypionate have been studied and reported.

Chemistry

Testosterone cypionate, or testosterone 17β-cyclopentylpropionate, is a synthetic androstane steroid and a derivative of testosterone. It is an androgen ester; specifically, it is the C17β cyclopentylpropionate (cypionate) ester of testosterone.

History
Testosterone cypionate was first synthesized in 1951 and was introduced for medical use in the United States the same year under the brand name Depo-Testosterone.

Society and culture

Generic names
Testosterone cypionate is the generic name of the drug and its . It has also been referred to as testosterone cipionate, as well as testosterone cyclopentylpropionate or testosterone cyclopentanepropionate.

Brand names 

Testosterone cypionate is or has been marketed under a variety of brand names, including:

 Andro Cyp
 Andronaq LA
 Andronate
 Dep Andro
 Dep Test
 Deposteron
 Depostomead
 Depotest
 Depo-Testosterone
 Depovirin
 Durandro
 Duratest
 Jectatest
 Malogen CYP
 Pertestis
 Testa-C
 Testadiate Depo
 Testex Elmu Prolongatum
 Testoject LA
 Virilon

Availability

Testosterone cypionate is marketed in the United States. It is not widely available outside of the United States, though it has been marketed in Canada, Australia, Spain, Brazil, and South Africa.

Legal status
Testosterone cypionate, along with other AAS, is a schedule III controlled substance in the United States under the Controlled Substances Act and a schedule IV controlled substance in Canada under the Controlled Drugs and Substances Act.

References

Androgens and anabolic steroids
Androstanes
Cypionate esters
Ketones
Testosterone esters